Ginette Seguin (19 April 1934 – 21 May 2019) was a Canadian alpine skier who competed in the 1956 Winter Olympics.

References

1934 births
2019 deaths
Canadian female alpine skiers
Olympic alpine skiers of Canada
Alpine skiers at the 1956 Winter Olympics